John Conley (born October 22, 1950) is a former American football tight end in the World Football League for the Southern California Sun. He played college football at the University of Hawaii.

Early years
Conley attended Savanna High School. He enrolled at Fullerton Junior College, where he played for two seasons. He transferred to the University of California, Berkeley after his sophomore season. He transferred to the University of Hawaii before the start of his senior season.

Professional career
Conley was selected by the Dallas Cowboys in the 16th round (410th overall) of the 1973 NFL Draft. He was waived before the start of the season in August.

On July 21, 1974, he signed with the Southern California Sun of the World Football League, to replace a suspended Jacque MacKinnon at tight end. He was used mostly for blocking, before being released on August 8.

References

External links
John Conley Stats

1950 births
Living people
Players of American football from Charlotte, North Carolina
American football tight ends
Fullerton Hornets football players
California Golden Bears football players
Hawaii Rainbow Warriors football players
Southern California Sun players